The Guadalajara metropolitan area (officially, in ) is the most populous metropolitan area of the Mexican state of Jalisco and the third largest in the country after Greater Mexico City and Monterrey. It includes the core municipality of Guadalajara and the surrounding municipalities of Zapopan, Tlaquepaque, Tonalá, Tlajomulco de Zúñiga, El Salto, Ixtlahuacán de los Membrillos and Juanacatlán.

Population

The Guadalajara metropolitan area had a total population of 4,796,603 in 2015, distributed in eight municipalities. (For more up-to-date data see the Spanish version of this article.)

References

 
Geography of Jalisco
Metropolitan areas of Mexico